St. Paulus Lutheran Church was a historic church located at 999 Eddy Street in San Francisco, California. The church was built from 1892 to 1894 and was located next to Jefferson Square Park.  

It was added to the National Register of Historic Places in 1982. On October 5, 1980, the church became San Francisco Designated Landmark, number 116. The church's designated landmark status was rescinded after the church was destroyed by fire on November 5, 1995.

History 
The site was converted to a community garden. On October 7, 2014, the San Francisco real estate website Socketsite announced the church had put the site up for sale. Construction was underway at the site in April 2019, and Saint Paulus is scheduled to reopen at this original site before the end of 2023.

In popular culture
The church is seen in the background of a few shots in the Alfred Hitchcock film Vertigo (1958) with James Stewart and Kim Novak.

See also
List of San Francisco Designated Landmarks

References

External links

St. Paulus Lutheran Church at NoeHill with historic photos
Historic photo at SF Main Library collection (1964)
KQED website of Vertigo locations including St. Paulus (February 22, 2013)
Facebook page for historic site
Saint Paulus Lutheran Church official website

Churches in San Francisco
Demolished churches in the United States
Demolished buildings and structures in California
Former buildings and structures in San Francisco
Lutheran churches in California
Churches completed in 1894
Buildings and structures demolished in 1995
Church fires in the United States
National Register of Historic Places in San Francisco
Churches on the National Register of Historic Places in California
San Francisco Designated Landmarks
Gothic Revival church buildings in California